James English may refer to:

 James E. English (18121890), United States Representative and Senator from Connecticut
 James F. English Jr. (19272020), American college president (Trinity College, Connecticut)
 James L. English (18131889), American lawyer and Democratic politician
 James Towers English (17821819), brigadier general, commander of the British Legion in the South American Wars of Independence
 James W. English (18371925), American politician and soldier
 Jim English (19322008), Irish hurler
 Leo James English (19071997), Australian compiler and editor of bilingual dictionaries in the Philippines